The Gigabyte GSmart G1305 Boston is a smartphone from Gigabyte Technology corporation.
The phone includes the MSM7227 SoC from Qualcomm which is equipped with an ARM11 processor running at 600 MHz.
This ARM11 processor has the following : ARMv6.

Note: The MSM7227 previously belonged to Qualcomm MSM7000 Series but MSM7227 and MSM7627 were later included in the Snapdragon S1 family from Qualcomm, see Snapdragon S1 family from Qualcomm.

Naming

The Gigabyte GSmart G1305 Boston is also recognized by other names like:
 Gigabyte GSmart G1305 Codfish
 Orange Boston

Clones

It appears that other smartphones are pure and simple clones of the Gigabyte GSmart G1305 Boston.
Here is a list of them:
 Optimus Boston

See also
 Full Smartphone Specifications - gsmarena.com
 Official Website for Mobile Communications - gsmart.gigabytecm.com
 Qualcomm MSM7x27 SoCs belonging to MSM7000 SoC Family
 Gigabyte GSmart Roma RX

References

Mobile phones introduced in 2010
Videotelephony
Gigabyte Technology